This article is about U.S. Coast Guard Island-class 110 foot patrol boat Squadrons. For U.S. Coast Guard Point-class 82 foot patrol boat Squadrons during the Vietnam War, see Coast Guard Squadron One instead.

Overview 

The U.S. Coast Guard established Patrol Boat Squadrons to manage the 110-foot long Island-class patrol boats. Squadron ONE (renamed FOUR) was established in Miami Beach, Florida, and Squadron TWO was established in Roosevelt Roads, Puerto Rico. Their message traffic plain language addresses were COGARD PATBOATRON ONE and TWO, respectively. Created during the end of the Cold War, they were expeditionary squadrons modeled after the successful Coast Guard Squadron One employed during the Vietnam War. They provided a modernized template for the creation of Patrol Forces Southwest Asia (PATFORSWA) and Patrol Forces Mediterranean (PATFORMED) during Operation Iraqi Freedom.

Cutters Assigned

CG Patrol Boat Squadron Four (One) cutters 

 USCGC FARALLON (WPB 1301)
 USCGC MANITOU (WPB 1302)
 USCGC MATAGORDA (WPB 1303)
 USCGC MAUI (WPB 1304)
 USCGC BARANOF (WPB 1318)
USCGC CHANDELEUR (WPB 1319)

CG Patrol Boat Squadron Two cutters 

 USCGC MONHEGAN (WPB 1305)
 USCGC NUNIVAK (WPB 1306)
 USCGC OCRACOKE (WPB 1307)
 USCGC VASHON (WPB 1308)
USCGC NANTUCKET (WPB 1316)

Squadron Staffs 
Each Squadron had staffs assigned for administration, supply, and maintenance.

Squadron ONE was commissioned 051600Z July 1985. Squadron ONE was under the operational and administrative control of Commander, Seventh Coast Guard District and homeported at Coast Guard Base Miami Beach, Florida. Squadron ONE was also designated Commanding Officer, Primary Crew Assembly Facility (PCAF) for the first 16 Island-class patrol boats.

Squadron TWO was commissioned 091847Z January 1986. Squadron TWO was under the operational control and administrative control of Greater Antilles Section (GANTSEC) homeported at U.S. Naval Base Roosevelt Roads, Puerto Rico.

Naval Integration 
The two Squadrons were designed for expeditionary employment and ease of integration in naval operations. As such, each patrol boat was programmed for 2,850 annual operating hours, which was 1,050 hours more than non-Squadron Island-class patrol boats.

In April 1989, Commander, Atlantic Area forwarded a memorandum to Coast Guard Headquarters COMDT (G-OCU-2) regarding administrative means to improve naval integration. At issue was that the Navy used even numbers to designate Commander In Chief, Atlantic Fleet (CINCLANTFLT) units and odd numbers to designate Commander In Chief, Pacific Fleet (CINCPACFLT) units. As such, it was recommended to rename PATBOATRON ONE to PATBOATRON FOUR. Similarly, it was recommended to rename the C-130 Logistics Support Squadron 201 (VCC 201) to Squadron 204 (VCC 204). By renaming these units in accordance with Navy convention, Atlantic Area sought to reduce mobilization confusion during a time of crisis.

Significant Operations 

 Operation BREAKOUT. Squadron One was awarded the Commandant's Meritorious Unit Commendation for Operation BREAKOUT.
 Hurricane HUGO recovery operations. A surface action group led by USCGC BEAR (WMEC 901) and consisting of USCGC MONHEGAN (WPB 1305), USCGC NUNIVAK (WPB 1307), USCGC OCRACOKE (WPB 1307), USCGC VASHON (WPB 1308), and USCGC NANTUCKET (WPB 1316) proceeded to the U.S. Virgin Islands to assess damages and provide humanitarian relief. At the direction of President George H. W. Bush, a boarding team from USCG VASHON (WPB 1308) went ashore in St. Croix, USVI to rescue 77 civilians barricaded in a hotel. Squadron Two staff were awarded the Commandant's Meritorious Unit Commendation for post-hurricane recovery operation in Puerto Rico.

Squadron Decommissioning 
The staffs of Squadrons FOUR and TWO were decommissioned on June 28, 1991 and July 1, 1991, respectively. The administrative control of their patrol boats was transferred to Commander, Group Miami Beach and Commander, Greater Antilles Section, respectively.

References 

Ships of the United States Coast Guard